Enrico Miglioranzi (born October 8, 1991) is an Italian ice hockey player for HC Bolzano in the ICE Hockey League (ICEHL) and the Italian national team.

He participated at the 2017 IIHF World Championship.

References

External links
 

1991 births
Living people
Italian ice hockey defencemen
Sportspeople from Padua
Italian expatriate ice hockey people
Italian expatriate sportspeople in Sweden
Asiago Hockey 1935 players
Bolzano HC players
Competitors at the 2013 Winter Universiade